Fuglebakken may refer to three locations, all in Denmark:

 Fuglebakken, Frederiksberg, a neighborhood in Copenhagen
 Fuglebakken station, a train station in Copenhagen
 Fuglebakken, a neighborhood in Aarhus V